The Facebook Bluetooth Beacon is a hardware beacon released by Facebook in 2015. The beacon uses a bluetooth connection to communicate with the Facebook app on the user's smartphone, informing it of the phone's location. The technology allows location-specific advertising to be pushed to the user's Facebook feed.

In June 2015, Facebook gave free beacons to a number of businesses in the United States.

See also
 Bluetooth low energy beacon
 Eddystone

References

Facebook
Automatic identification and data capture
Geopositioning
Ubiquitous computing
Indoor positioning system
Bluetooth